Texas to Tennessee is the eleventh studio album by American country music artist Clay Walker. It was released on July 30, 2021 as his first album for Show Dog Nashville. The lead-off single, "Need a Bar Sometimes", was released in August 2020 and became Walker's first charting single on the Billboard Country Airplay chart since "Jesse James" in 2012.

The album's title is a reference to Walker recording the album in both Nashville, Tennessee and Galveston, Texas. Walker co-wrote all ten tracks on the album, six of which were co-written with Jaron Boyer, who produced the album alongside Michael Knox.

Track listing

Chart performance

References

2021 albums
Clay Walker albums
Show Dog-Universal Music albums
Albums produced by Michael Knox (record producer)